Devante Downs (born October 18, 1995) is a former American football linebacker. He played college football at California.

Professional career

Minnesota Vikings
Downs was drafted by the Minnesota Vikings in the seventh round (225th overall) of the 2018 NFL Draft. He finished his rookie year with two tackles.

On August 31, 2019, Downs was waived by the Vikings and was signed to the practice squad the next day. He was promoted to the active roster on September 14, 2019. He was waived on September 24, 2019.

New York Giants
On October 1, 2019, Downs was signed to the New York Giants practice squad. He was promoted to the active roster on October 22, 2019.

In Week 1 of the 2020 season against the Pittsburgh Steelers on Monday Night Football, Downs recovered a muffed punt by Diontae Johnson during the 26–16 loss.

Downs re-signed with the Giants on March 24, 2021. He was waived on August 31, 2021.

References

External links
 California Golden Bears profile

1995 births
Living people
American football linebackers
California Golden Bears football players
Minnesota Vikings players
New York Giants players
People from Mountlake Terrace, Washington
Players of American football from Washington (state)
Sportspeople from the Seattle metropolitan area